First singles by Cristina D'Avena contain "Il valzer del moscerino", her first song presented at the tenth Zecchino d'Oro, in addition to a single destinated to Japan. Later, Five Record publishes most of her singles, which are recorded in 45 rpm discs, from 1981 to 1991. From 1991 to 2009, no singles are published, whereby her songs are published only in her albums.

Since 2009, D'Avena singles are published mainly in digital download.

45 rpm singles published from 1968 to 1991

First singles

Five Record singles

Notes

Singles published since 2009

Notes

See also
Cristina D'Avena albums discography
List of theme songs recorded by Cristina D'Avena
List of covers recorded by Cristina D'Avena
List of songs recorded by Cristina D'Avena
D'Avena, Cristina